Artur Petrosyan (born 17 December 1971) is a Armenian football coach and a former midfielder. He is the manager of Swiss club FC Thalwil.

Career
Petrosyan was the all-time leading scorer for the Armenia national football team, having scored 11 goals, and had participated in 69 international matches since his debut in the national team's first game in a home friendly match against Moldova on 14 October 1992. Henrikh Mkhitaryan overtook Petrosyan as Armenia's all-time scorer in 2013.

He worked as youth coach of FC Zürich, the last club he played for as a professional.

He also worked as the manager of Grasshopper Club Zürich's under 18 squad.

Armenia
In October 2016, Petrosyan become the manager of Armenia national football team.

National team statistics

International goals

Honours
Shirak Gyumri
Armenian Premier League (4): 1992, 1994, 1995, 1999
Armenian Supercup (2): 1996, 1999
Maccabi Petach Tikva
Toto Cup (1): 1999
FC Zürich
Swiss Cup (1): 2005
Swiss Super League (1): 2005–06

Managerial statistics

References

External links

armfootball.tripod.com

1971 births
Living people
Footballers from Gyumri
Armenian footballers
Armenia international footballers
Armenian expatriate footballers
FC Shirak players
Maccabi Petah Tikva F.C. players
FC Lokomotiv Nizhny Novgorod players
BSC Young Boys players
FC Zürich players
Armenian Premier League players
Russian Premier League players
Swiss Super League players
Expatriate footballers in Israel
Expatriate footballers in Russia
Expatriate footballers in Switzerland
Expatriate football managers in Switzerland
Armenian expatriate sportspeople in Israel
Armenian expatriate sportspeople in Russia
Armenian expatriate sportspeople in Switzerland
Armenian football managers
Armenia national football team managers
Association football midfielders
Soviet Armenians
Soviet footballers